"Bitchcraft" is the premiere episode of the third season of the anthology television series American Horror Story, which premiered on October 9, 2013 on the cable network FX. The episode title is a portmanteau of the words bitch and witchcraft.

This episode was nominated for Primetime Emmy Awards for Outstanding Costumes for a Miniseries, Movie or a Special and Outstanding Writing for a Miniseries, Movie or a Dramatic Special.

The episode introduces a group of four young witches who are given instruction in how to use their powers at a boarding school in New Orleans run by Cordelia Foxx (Sarah Paulson). Flashbacks tell the story of the cruel Delphine LaLaurie (Kathy Bates), a 19th-century New Orleans socialite who mutilated slaves as a part of her rituals for everlasting life. In the contemporary storyline, the world's most powerful witch and Foxx's mother Fiona Goode (Jessica Lange) excavates LaLaurie in order to learn her secrets. Angela Bassett and Gabourey Sidibe guest star as Marie Laveau and Queenie, respectively.

"Bitchcraft" held the highest ratings of any episode of American Horror Story, before it was surpassed a year later by the fourth-season premiere episode "Monsters Among Us". This episode is rated TV-MA (LSV).

Plot

1834
Wealthy socialite Madame Delphine LaLaurie holds an extravagant soiree in her mansion. Afterwards Delphine washes her face with human blood harvested from her slaves as a beauty treatment. She discovers her daughter had sex with Bastien, a slave. Delphine has a bull's head put over Bastien's head, resembling the Minotaur.

2013
Zoe Benson has sex with her boyfriend Charlie, which causes Charlie to die from an apparent brain aneurysm. This reveals Zoe is a witch. She is sent to a school for witches in New Orleans called Miss Robichaux's Academy where she meets the headmistress, Cordelia Foxx, who explains that every witch possesses a power of her own, but in each generation there is the Supreme, an all-powerful witch. She also mentions that a witch Misty Day was burned alive after she brought a bird back to life. The other students are Nan, who can read the minds of others, Queenie, who can make injuries she inflicts on her body appear on whomever she chooses without harming herself, calling herself a human Voodoo doll, and Madison, a former teen actress who can move objects with her mind. Madison befriends Zoe, and invites her along to a frat party she will be attending.

At the party Zoe meets frat boy Kyle Spencer, who immediately falls for her and is determined to get to know her. Meanwhile, Madison is drugged by Kyle's frat brother Archie Brener and, along with his other frat brothers, gang-rapes her. Afterwards, she vengefully flips their bus over, with Kyle and the frat brothers on board.

Fiona Goode, the current Supreme and Cordelia's mother, arrives at the school after hearing of Misty. Fiona takes the girls on a field trip and Nan leads them to a tour of LaLaurie's mansion. The tour guide reveals that LaLaurie's body has never been found, but Nan tells Fiona that she can tell where LaLaurie is buried.

In a hospital, Zoe finds out Kyle died, but Brener survived. She rapes his unconscious body, deliberately killing him vengefully by again causing a brain aneurysm.

That night, Fiona has an alive LaLaurie dug up and brought to the Academy.

Reception
In its original American broadcast, "Bitchcraft" received a 3.0 18–49 ratings share and was watched by 5.54 million viewers, which was the highest total viewers of any American Horror Story episode until the fourth-season premiere "Monsters Among Us".

Rotten Tomatoes reports an 80% approval rating, based on 15 reviews. The critical consensus reads, ""Bitchcraft" jump-starts American Horror Story: Coven with an ambitious setup, lively characters, and stylized action, though the overall narrative may come off shallower than intended." Entertainment Weekly awarded the episode with a series high rating of A−, writing, "The season opener, "Bitchcraft", is a witty critique of our cultural uneasiness with female power, sexual and otherwise" and applauded the strong characters: "[Ryan Murphy's] sharp take on a woman's role is both funny and mordantly serious." Cinema Blend gave the episode 4 out of 5 stars, stating, "The season premiere offers a little bit of everything we've come to appreciate about American Horror Story, in that it pulls no punches, twisting violence, sex and gore into a wickedly dark but altogether entrancing introduction to Ryan Murphy and Brad Falchuk's next dark tale."

Emily VanDerWerff of The A.V. Club gave the episode a C+, citing uncertainty about the tone of the program but hope that the rest of the season will be good. Her review ends, "Yes, we know vaguely what the show's approach is going to be, and yes, we can expect that when Lange and Paulson are on screen, things will be pretty good. But we're also left wondering whether that minotaur is meant to be a campy joke or a very real horror and whether anyone involved understands what the divergence point is between those two things."

At The New York Times, Neil Genzlinger characterized the episode as "an eclectic mix" that "ricochets raucously between hilarious camp and blunt brutality." Genzlinger notes that thanks to the cast, such drastic shifts work "particularly well" in this episode. Along similar lines, The Huffington Post writer Maggie Furlong pronounced the episode "delightful," "fun," and "accessible," with a "lighter, more comedic tone" than previous seasons of the show. Rakesh Satyal of Vulture awarded the episode 4 out of 5 stars, calling it "one action-packed, satisfying, yet hurl-worthy episode".

References

External links

 
 "Bitchcraft" at TV Guide.com

2013 American television episodes
American Horror Story: Coven episodes
Fiction set in 1834
Television episodes about rape
Television episodes written by Brad Falchuk
Television episodes written by Ryan Murphy (writer)